This is a list of songs which reached number one on the Billboard Mainstream Top 40 (or Pop Songs) chart in 2018.

During 2018, a total of 19 singles hit number-one on the charts.

Chart history

See also
2018 in American music

References

External links
Current Billboard Pop Songs chart

Billboard charts
Mainstream Top 40 2018
United States Mainstream Top 40